Toli chowki is a neighbourhood in Hyderabad, Telangana, India. The name Tolichowki comes from the Urdu word 'Toli', meaning 'troupe', and 'Chowki', meaning 'post'. It is close to the IT corridor like Gachibowli, Madhapur, Manikonda and Kondapur, hence making it a preferred residential for people working in the IT industry. The real estate sector has received a boost due to its proximity to high-end technology firms. Tolichowki has also had a boost in the restaurant and fast food industry. It is known to attract many customers from all around due to having multi-cuisine meals all around the area. There has been an emergence of Arab cuisine in the area due to  Middle Eastern people's moving in the area for medical or academic purposes. This in return has improved Tolichowki's market value for foreigners

History
During the period of Abul Hasan Qutb Shah, the troops of Mughal Emperor Aurangzeb Alamgir set a military position in this region, which is in the vicinity of the Golconda Fort of the Qutb Shahi dynasty. Still today, there are many historical mosques, tombs and other monuments in the surrounding areas.

Transport 
There are many buses which connect to different parts of the city. There are buses from Toli Chowki to Mehdipatnam, Lakdi ka pul, Abids, Koti, Secunderabad (bus transfer in Mehdipatnam), Charminar (bus transfer in Mehdipatnam), Shaikpet, Hi-Tech City, Gachibowli, Patancheru and BHEL. Apart from public buses, Mini-taxis are also available from Toli Chowki.

GHMC Location

According to GHMC, Tolichowki comes under Circle 7, Ward 70 List of Hyderabad Corporation wards#List of Zones.

References

Neighbourhoods in Hyderabad, India
Villages in Ranga Reddy district